Orlando Canizales (born November 25, 1965) is an American former professional boxer who competed from 1984 to 1999. He held the IBF bantamweight title between July 1988 and December 1994.

Early life
Canizales who is of Mexican descent was born in Laredo, the seat of Webb County in South Texas. There he began training at the age of ten at the Boys and Girls Clubs of America. He is the younger brother of fellow bantamweight world champion Gaby Canizales. Both brothers obtained the title of world boxing champion at the same age and weight.

Professional boxing career

Canizales turned professional in 1984 and was undefeated in twelve fights (one fight was a draw) before meeting the 1984 Olympic gold medalist Paul Gonzales in 1986. Gonzales defeated him over twelve rounds. Canizales rebounded from that defeat, however, and on July 9, 1988, he won the IBF bantamweight title by knocking out defending titlist Kelvin Seabrooks in the fifteenth round. He tied the division record for consecutive title defences at 15 set by Manuel Ortiz. His victims included old foe Gonzales, former flyweight champion Rolando Bohol, British champion Billy Hardy, and future champion Clarence "Bones" Adams. Many people incorrectly state that Orlando Canizales made 16 consecutive defences. This is due to many of them counting a no contest with Derrick Whiteboy as a title defence. No contests are not title defences however as the champion can't defend his title in a match that isn't considered to be a proper boxing contest.

In January 1995, Canizales attempted to win a title in the junior featherweight division. World Boxing Association champion Wilfredo Vazquez prevented him from doing so, winning a twelve-round split decision.

He continued fighting until 1999, when future champion Frank Toledo defeated him via ten-round split decision. He retired after that loss.

He was inducted into the International Boxing Hall of Fame on July 14, 2009. With his parents watching, an emotional Canizales approached the podium and delivered a heartfelt speech. "Boxing has taught me a lot in life -- that dedication, discipline and determination will pay off in the long run and not to be easily swayed by obstacles and bumps in the road."

The Orlando & Gaby Canizales Boxing Gym and Community Center on Guadalupe Street in Laredo is named in honor of Orlando and his brother Gaby.

Professional boxing record

References

External links
 
Dog House Boxing interview

|-

|-

1965 births
Living people
Bantamweight boxers
World bantamweight boxing champions
International Boxing Federation champions
International Boxing Hall of Fame inductees
American boxers of Mexican descent
People from Laredo, Texas
Boxers from Houston
World boxing champions
American male boxers